Nikšić is a village in the municipality of Batočina, Serbia. According to the 2011 census, the village had a population of 176 people.

References

Populated places in Šumadija District
Batočina